Apriyani Rahayu (born 29 April 1998) is an Indonesian badminton player specializing in doubles. She and Greysia Polii are the reigning Olympic champions in the women's doubles following their win at the 2020 Summer Olympics. She won gold at the 2019 Southeast Asian Games, and two bronze medals at the World Championships in 2018 and 2019. Rahayu also won bronze medals at the 2018 Asian Games in the women's team and doubles with her former partner Greysia Polii.

Early life
Apriyani Rahayu was born in Lawulo village, a remote settlement in Konawe Regency in Southeast Sulawesi. She is the youngest child of an agricultural worker named Ameruddin Pora and his wife, Sitti Jauhar. As a child Rahayu would fight with neighborhood boys, and her father encouraged her to devote her energy to badminton instead, which she agreed to. According to Rahayu's cousin, her father served as her trainer, with a training regimen including running 10 kilometers to competitions and practicing on a homemade court behind his house lined with areca nut trees. Pora was self-sufficient but poor. Rahayu used a homemade wooden racquet with fishing line for string, until her father was able to sell enough vegetables to buy a real racquet. However, Pora himself credits Rahayu's mother as providing her with support and training. Sitti Jauhar was an enthusiastic player of badminton, table tennis and volleyball and encouraged Rahayu to be tough and competitive. In 2007, at the age of 9, she represented Konawe Regency in a regional competition. In 2011, at the age of 13, she was scouted by Yuslan Kisra who brought her in contact with Icuk Sugiarto who recruited her to his club PB Pelita Bakri (now ISTC) and later on PB Jaya Raya Jakarta for international level play. Sitti Jauhar died in 2015 while Apriyani was at a championship in Peru, but she played through after hearing the news, winning two medals.

Career

2017: French Open and Thailand Open title 
In May, Rahayu partnered with her senior and mentor Greysia Polii, and they competed as a new pair at the Sudirman Cup in Gold Coast, Australia. Even though they had only been paired for about a month, the duo won their first title in the Thailand Open after defeating the home pair Chayanit Chaladchalam and Phataimas Muenwong in straight games 21–12, 21–12 in the final. They also won the Superseries title at the French Open, just five months into their partnership. Other achievements by Polii and Rahayu in 2017 were runner-up in Hong Kong, semi-finalists in New Zealand, and quarter-finalists in Korea Open. Rahayu also helped the Indonesia women's team win the bronze medal at the Southeast Asian Games held in Kuala Lumpur, unfortunately, in the individual women's doubles event, she and Polii lost in the first round to eventual champion Jongkolphan Kititharakul and Rawinda Prajongjai of Thailand. The Polii and Rahayu partnership, first paired in May, reached a career high as world number 10 in the BWF World rankings in November.

2018: India Open and third Thailand Open title 
In January, Rahayu and Polii began the season by finishing as runners-up in the Indonesia Masters, losing to second seeded Misaki Matsutomo and Ayaka Takahashi in the final. A month later, the duo played as the third seeds in the India Open and won the title after beating the first-seeded Christinna Pedersen and Kamilla Rytter Juhl in the semi-finals, and the second-seeded Jongkolphan Kititharakul and Rawinda Prajongjai in the final. She featured in the Indonesian women's team that won bronze at the Asia Team Championships held in Alor Setar and were quarter-finalists in the Uber Cup in Bangkok. In July, she and her partner lost in the quarter-finals of the Indonesia Open to Yuki Fukushima and Sayaka Hirota, but a week later, she won her second Thailand Open title, as she and Polii defended the title they had won in Thailand the previous year, when the event was known as the Grand Prix. In August, Rahayu and Polii won the bronze medal at the World Championships in Nanjing, and further bronze medals at the Asian Games in the women's doubles and team events. In the remainder of the 2018 tour, she and Polii only reached the semi-finals in Japan, China, Denmark, French, Hong Kong, and quarter-finals in the Fuzhou China Open. The duo achieved their career high as world number 3 in the BWF rankings in September.

2019: Second India Open, first Southeast Asian Games 
Rahayu opened the 2019 season as a finalist in the Malaysia Masters with Polii. In the semi-finals, they beat their arch-rivals Misaki Matsutomo and Ayaka Takahashi in a close rubber game, improving their head-to-head record against the Japanese pair to 2–8. A week later, they again lost to Matsutomo and Takahashi in the Indonesia Masters. They led 18–10 in the first game, but lost it 20–22, eventually losing the match in a close rubber game. In March, she and Polii lost in the quarter-finals of both the German and All England Open. Polii and Rahayu then clinched their second India Open title defeating Chow Mei Kuan and Lee Meng Yean in the final. In May, she alongside the Indonesia team finished as semi-finalists in the Sudirman Cup in Nanning, settling for the bronze medal. In June, she and Polii advanced to the semi-finals of the Australian Open after beating the first seeded, world number one Mayu Matsumoto and Wakana Nagahara in the quarter-finals, but the duo were beaten by Chinese pair Chen Qingchen and Jia Yifan, the fifth defeat in seven meetings between them. At the World Championships in Basel, Switzerland, she and her partner won the bronze medal, after defeat in the semi-finals to eventual champions Matsumoto and Nagahara. After the World Championships, her coach, Eng Hian, evaluated that she and Rahayu had fallen short of their previous standard. In the end of 2019 season, their best results were only the semi-finalists in Chinese Taipei Open, after that, they often lost in the initial stage. She finally won her first women's doubles gold medal at the Southeast Asian Games. She and Polii defeated Chayanit Chaladchalam and Phataimas Muenwong of Thailand 21–3, 21–18.

2020: Home soil title 

In 2020, Rahayu and Polii who ranked as world number eight started their tour in the Malaysia Masters. At that tournament, they finished as semi-finalists defeated by Chinese pair Li Wenmei and Zheng Yu in a rubber game. A week later in the Indonesia Masters, Rahayu won her first ever international title in Indonesia, after she and Polii triumphed in a thrilling match against Maiken Fruergaard and Sara Thygesen of Denmark. In February, she won her second title of the year by winning the Barcelona Spain Masters. In the final, she and Polii defeated Gabriela and Stefani Stoeva of Bulgaria in a rubber game. In March All England Open, she and her partner lost in the first round to Korean pair Chang Ye-na and Kim Hye-rin in straight games. Due to the COVID-19 pandemic, numerous tournaments on the 2020 BWF World Tour were either cancelled or rescheduled for later in the year.

2021–2022: Olympic Games gold medal and new partner
Rahayu returned in the international competitions at the 2020 Asian Leg tournament in January 2021. Together with Polii, she won her first ever BWF Super 1000 tournament, the Yonex Thailand Open. A week later in the semi-finals of the Toyota Thailand Open, Rahayu and Polii fell in two games to Lee So-hee and Shin Seung-chan of South Korea. The duo then played at the World Tour Finals, but was eliminated in the group stage.

In March 2021, Rahayu scheduled to participating at the All England Open, but later Indonesia team were forced to withdraw from the competition by BWF after the team members will self-isolate for 10 days from the date of their inbound flight after an anonym person traveling onboard tested positive for COVID-19.

On 2 August 2021, at the Tokyo 2020 Olympics she partnered with Greysia Polii in the women's doubles. In the finals they defeated 2017 world champion Chen Qingchen and Jia Yifan. They became the first unseeded pair to win the gold medal in women's doubles. This was Indonesia's first Olympic gold in women's doubles. She and Polii are the third and fourth Indonesian women to win Olympic gold after Susi Susanti in 1992 and Liliyana Natsir in 2016. Rahayu and Polii's win made Indonesia the only country outside of China to have won gold medals in all five disciplines of Badminton at the Summer Olympics. After her Olympic success, the Student Sports Training Center in Jakarta was named after her and Greysia Polii. In November 2021, Rahayu and Polii lost the finals of the 2021 Indonesia Open.

In May 2022, at the 2021 Southeast Asian Games, she started her journey with new partner, Siti Fadia Silva Ramadhanti. The duo clinched the gold medal in the women's doubles after beating the Thai pair of Benyapa Aimsaard and Nuntakarn Aimsaard in the final. This new pair immediately showed satisfying results, by winning the Malaysia and Singapore Opens, and became finalists in the Indonesia Masters.

2023 
In January, Rahayu with Ramadhanti had to retired in the semi-finals of Malaysia Open from first seed Chinese pair Chen Qingchen and Jia Yifan, because of the injury of Ramadhanti. They competed in the home tournament, Indonesia Masters, but unfortunately lost in the quarter-finals from 4th seed Thai pair Jongkolphan Kititharakul and Rawinda Prajongjai.

In February, Rahayu join the Indonesia national badminton team to compete at the Badminton Asia Mixed Team Championships, but unfortunately the teams lost in the quarter-finals from team Korea.

Awards and nominations

Achievements

Olympic Games 
Women's doubles

BWF World Championships
Women's doubles

Asian Games 
Women's doubles

Southeast Asian Games 
Women's doubles

BWF World Junior Championships 
Girls' doubles

Mixed doubles

Asian Junior Championships 
Mixed doubles

BWF World Tour (8 titles, 4 runners-up) 
The BWF World Tour, which was announced on 19 March 2017 and implemented in 2018, is a series of elite badminton tournaments sanctioned by the Badminton World Federation (BWF). The BWF World Tour is divided into levels of World Tour Finals, Super 1000, Super 750, Super 500, Super 300, and the BWF Tour Super 100.

Women's doubles

BWF Superseries (1 title, 1 runner-up) 
The BWF Superseries, which was launched on 14 December 2006 and implemented in 2007, was a series of elite badminton tournaments, sanctioned by the Badminton World Federation (BWF). BWF Superseries levels were Superseries and Superseries Premier. A season of Superseries consisted of twelve tournaments around the world that had been introduced since 2011. Successful players were invited to the Superseries Finals, which were held at the end of each year.

Women's doubles

  BWF Superseries Finals tournament
  BWF Superseries Premier tournament
  BWF Superseries tournament

BWF Grand Prix (1 title) 
The BWF Grand Prix had two levels, the Grand Prix and Grand Prix Gold. It was a series of badminton tournaments sanctioned by the Badminton World Federation (BWF) and played between 2007 and 2017.

Women's doubles

  BWF Grand Prix Gold tournament
  BWF Grand Prix tournament

BWF International Challenge/Series (3 titles, 1 runner-up) 
Women's doubles

Mixed doubles

  BWF International Challenge tournament
  BWF International Series tournament

BWF Junior International (2 titles) 
Girls' doubles

Mixed doubles

  BWF Junior International Grand Prix tournament
  BWF Junior International Challenge tournament
  BWF Junior International Series tournament
  BWF Junior Future Series tournament

Performance timeline

National team 
 Junior level

 Senior level

Individual competitions

Junior level 
Girls' doubles

Mixed doubles

Senior level

Women's doubles

Mixed doubles

Record against selected opponents 
Record against year-end Finals finalists, World Championships semi-finalists, and Olympic quarter-finalists.

Greysia Polii

References

External links

1998 births
Living people
People from Konawe Regency
Sportspeople from Southeast Sulawesi
Indonesian female badminton players
Badminton players at the 2020 Summer Olympics
Olympic badminton players of Indonesia
Olympic gold medalists for Indonesia
Olympic medalists in badminton
Medalists at the 2020 Summer Olympics
Badminton players at the 2018 Asian Games
Asian Games bronze medalists for Indonesia
Asian Games medalists in badminton
Medalists at the 2018 Asian Games
Competitors at the 2017 Southeast Asian Games
Competitors at the 2019 Southeast Asian Games
Competitors at the 2021 Southeast Asian Games
Southeast Asian Games gold medalists for Indonesia
Southeast Asian Games silver medalists for Indonesia
Southeast Asian Games bronze medalists for Indonesia
Southeast Asian Games medalists in badminton